Kojibiose is a disaccharide. It is a product of the caramelization of glucose. It is also present in honey (approx. 3%).

Kojibiose has a mild sweet taste, but low calorie count. In combination with its prebiotic properties, kojibiose could function as a sugar substitute. However, kojibiose is hard to synthesize on an industrial scale.
Recently, two enzyme approaches transforming sucrose and lactose or sucrose and glucose into kojibiose have been developed, potentially solving the synthetization problem.

References 

Disaccharides